Robert Watts Creamer (July 14, 1922 – July 18, 2012) was an American sportswriter and editor. He spent most of his career at Sports Illustrated.

Biography
Creamer was born on July 14, 1922 in Bronxville, New York

He attended Fordham and Syracuse Universities but never graduated. In World War II, he fought in Germany and was wounded. During Operation Bodenplatte, the German Luftwaffe's last offensive operation, Creamer was on the ground watching the aerial combat around him. A German Bf 109 fighter roared into make a strafing run on Creamer's position. Creamer ducked behind a mound of dirt, then pulled out his .45 pistol and fired at the German plane. Creamer described it as trying "to hit a fly with a BB gun." Following his discharge, he worked in advertising as a copywriter and at Collier's Encyclopedia as an assistant editor.

Creamer was one of the first hired on the staff of Sports Illustrated in 1954.  He served the magazine as a senior editor from inception to 1984, and wrote the weekly Scorecard section of the magazine. He also wrote for The New York Times.

As an author, Creamer wrote what many consider the definitive biography of Babe Ruth, titled Babe: The Legend Comes to Life, in 1974. Reviewing the book for The New York Times Book Review, Roger Angell wrote that Ruth had "at last found the biographer he deserves in Robert Creamer." Creamer wrote seven other baseball related books, including biographies of Mickey Mantle, Casey Stengel, Ralph Houk, the sportscaster Red Barber and the umpire Jocko Conlan.  He also wrote Baseball in '41: A Celebration of the "Best Baseball Season Ever" (1991) (later published in paperback as Baseball and Other Matters in 1941). Creamer's lone novel, A Resemblance to Persons Living and Dead, is loosely based on politics, personages, and the environs of Tuckahoe and the town of Eastchester, New York.

In retirement, Creamer occasionally wrote retrospective articles for SI and could be seen on television commenting on historical moments in sports, many of which he had covered. Creamer was a recipient of the 2012 Henry Chadwick Award from the Society for American Baseball Research (SABR). He also appeared in Ken Burns' documentary Baseball and numerous other television baseball programs, including When It Was a Game.

Creamer died of prostate cancer on July 18, 2012 in Saratoga Springs.

References

1922 births
2012 deaths
Baseball writers
Deaths from cancer in New York (state)
Deaths from prostate cancer
Fordham University alumni
People from Bronxville, New York
People from Tuckahoe, Westchester County, New York
United States Army personnel of World War II
Sportswriters from New York (state)
Syracuse University alumni